Thomas Thynne, 2nd Viscount Weymouth (21 May 1710 – 1751) of Longleat House in Wiltshire was an English peer, descended from  Sir John Thynne (c.1515-1580) builder of Longleat.

Origins
He was born on 21 May 1710, the son of Thomas Thynne (d.1710) by his wife Lady Mary Villiers. His father died a month before Thomas was born.

Inheritance

On 28 July 1714, aged four, on the death of his great uncle Thomas Thynne, 1st Viscount Weymouth, he inherited Longleat House and its great estates and succeeded to the baronetcy of Thynne, of Kempsford, Gloucestershire, and (by special remainder) to the titles of Baron Thynne of Warminster, Wiltshire, and Viscount Weymouth, of Dorset.

Career
In 1733 he was appointed High Steward of Tamworth and was also Grand Master of the Premier Grand Lodge of England from 1735 to 1736. Between 4 December 1739 and 1751, he held the royal offices of Keeper of Hyde Park, Keeper of the Mall, and Ranger of St. James's Park, all in the City of Westminster. Shortly after his Hyde Park appointment, he began the construction of the Serpentine Lakes at Longleat, apparently in imitation of Hyde Park's Serpentine.

Marriages and children
He married twice:
Firstly on 6 December 1726, to Lady Elizabeth Sackville (d.1729), a daughter of Lionel Sackville, 1st Duke of Dorset.

Secondly he married Lady Louisa Carteret (c.1712–1736), a daughter of John Carteret, 2nd Earl Granville and a co-heiress of her childless brother Robert Carteret, 3rd Earl Granville (1721–1776). On her father's side she was a great-grand-daughter of John Granville, 1st Earl of Bath (1628–1701), and her father's first-cousin was William Granville, 3rd Earl of Bath (1692–1711), on whose death the Earldom of Bath became extinct. The title of Marquess of Bath was later created for her eldest son in 1789 (see below), the title Earl of Bath being then unavailable as it had been recreated for a member of the Pulteney family. When Louisa died in childbirth, in her early twenties, her friend, Mrs Delany, wrote:"Her husband's ... loss is irreparable." During her illness, Mrs Delany had written that "my Lord Weymouth is like a madman". By Louisa Carteret he had two sons:
Thomas Thynne, 1st Marquess of Bath (1734–1796), eldest son and heir, created Marquess of Bath in 1789. He inherited Longleat House and his father's vast estates.
Henry Carteret, 1st Baron Carteret (1735–1826), created Baron Carteret (2nd creation) in 1784. As a second son under the system of primogeniture he had little expectation of a rich inheritance. However, in 1776, by Act of Parliament, he changed his name and arms to Carteret, in compliance with his inheritance from his childless uncle Robert Carteret, 3rd Earl Granville, 3rd Baron Carteret (1721–1776) (under the terms of the will of the latter's father John Carteret, 2nd Earl Granville, 2nd Baron Carteret (1690–1763), of his estates including Hawnes Park (now Haynes Park), in Bedfordshire and Stowe House, Kilkhampton in Cornwall (the ancient seat of the Granvilles, Earls of Bath). He also succeeded him as Bailiff of Jersey, a post (for life) long held by heads of the Carteret family. In 1784 he was created Baron Carteret, of Hawnes, thus reviving his uncle's second title.

Death and burial
He died on 12 January 1750/51, at Horningsham, Wiltshire, and was buried there on 22 January.

References

1710 births
1751 deaths
2
Freemasons of the Premier Grand Lodge of England
Grand Masters of the Premier Grand Lodge of England
Thomas